Red Branch is an unincorporated community in Trinity County, Texas, United States, near the Houston County line. Red Branch had a school, which opened before 1896 and was consolidated in 1938. By the 1990s, all that remained of the community were some dispersed homes.

References

Unincorporated communities in Trinity County, Texas
Unincorporated communities in Texas